Chinelo Okparanta (born 1981) is a Nigerian-American novelist and short-story writer. She was born in Port Harcourt, Nigeria, where she was raised until the age of 10, when she emigrated to the United States with her family.

Early life
Chinelo Okparanta was born in Port Harcourt, Nigeria, and at the age of 10 migrated with her family to the US. She was educated at Pennsylvania State University (Schreyer Honors College), Rutgers University and the Iowa Writers' Workshop.

Career
Okparanta has published short stories in publications including Granta, The New Yorker, Tin House, The Kenyon Review, The Southern Review, TriQuarterly, Conjunctions, Subtropics and The Coffin Factory. Her essays have appeared in AGNI, The Story Prize blog, and the University of Iowa, International Writing Program blog.
Okparanta has held fellowships or visiting professorships at The University of Iowa, Colgate University, Purdue University, City College of New York, and Columbia University. She was associate professor of English & Creative Writing (Fiction) at Bucknell University, where she was also C. Graydon & Mary E. Rogers Faculty Research Fellow as well as Margaret Hollinshead Ley Professor in Poetry & Creative Writing until 2021. She is currently associate professor of English and Director of the Program in Creative Writing at Swarthmore College. 

Her debut short-story collection, Happiness, Like Water (Granta Books and Houghton Mifflin Harcourt), was longlisted for the 2013 Frank O'Connor International Short Story Award, a finalist for the 2014 New York Public Library Young Lions Fiction Award, and won the 2014 Lambda Literary Award for Lesbian Fiction. She has been nominated for a United States Artists Fellowship and was a finalist for the 2014 Rolex Mentor and Protégé Arts Initiative in Literature. Other honors include the 2013 Society of Midland Authors Award (finalist), the 2013 Caine Prize for African Writing (finalist), and more.

Her short story "Fairness" was 2014 included in The PEN/O. Henry Prize Stories, among 20 short stories of this year.

Happiness, Like Water was an Editors' Choice for The New York Times Book Review on September 20, 2013. The collection was also listed as one of The Guardians Best African Fiction of 2013, and in December 2014 was announced as being a finalist for the Nigerian Etisalat Prize for Literature."Candidates announced for Etisalat Prize for Literature", The Nation, December 14, 2014.

Her first novel, Under the Udala Trees, was published in 2015. The New York Times reviewer called Okparanta "a graceful and precise writer", and The Guardian (UK) describes the book as "a gripping novel about a young gay woman's coming of age in Nigeria during the Nigerian civil war..." in which "...Okparanta deftly negotiates a balance between a love story and a war story."

Under the Udala Trees was a New York Times Book Review Editors' Choice as well as a nominee for the 2015 Kirkus Reviews Prize in Fiction. One of NPR's "Best Books of 2015", it also made the BuzzFeed, The Wall Street Journal, The Millions, Bustle, Shelf Awareness, and Publishers Lunch "Best of" and "Most Anticipated" lists, among others. It was long-listed for the 2015 Center for Fiction First Novel Prize, nominated for the 2016 NAACP Image Award for Outstanding Literary Work of Fiction, nominated for the 2016 Hurston-Wright Legacy Award in Fiction, a finalist for the 2016 Publishing Triangle Literary Awards (the Ferro-Grumley Award), a semi-finalist for the 2016 VCU Cabell First Novelist Award, long-listed for the 2016 Chautauqua Prize, and won the 2016 Lambda Literary Award in the General Lesbian Fiction category.

Under the Udala Trees also won the 2016 Jessie Redmon Fauset Book Award in Fiction and was a 2017 Amelia Bloomer Project Selection of the American Library Association. It was also shortlisted for the 2017 International Dublin Literary Award.

In 2017, Okparanta won the Publishing Triangle's 2016 inaugural Betty Berzon Emerging Writer Award. 

Pulse Nigeria named Under the Udala Trees one of its 10 Outstanding Nigerian Books for 2015. YNaija listed it as one of its Ten Most Notable Books of 2015. Afridiaspora listed it as one of the Best African Novels of 2015.

In April 2017, Okparanta was selected by Granta for their once in a decade Best of Young American Novelists list."Granta's list of the best young American novelists", The Guardian, April 26, 2017.

Her essay "Trump in the Classroom" is included in the 2019 anthology New Daughters of Africa, edited by Margaret Busby.Legacy'''

Chinelo Okparanta has been credited for being a champion for marginalized and underprivileged voices throughout her career by the novelist, Helon Habila.

Okparanta’s three books, “Happiness Like Water,” “Under the Udala Tree,” and her most recent, “Harry Sylvester Bird” have championed the stories of LGBTQ community and people of color through local insider perspective and interracial outsider perspectives. 

The most notable thing about Okparanta is that began writing about these demographics in the time when it was dangerous to do so especially from around Nigeria. Her courage in telling her story is a contrast from her gentle and retreating personality, hence in a profile on the Open Country Magazine by Paula Willie-Okafor, Okparanta was tagged, “The Gentle Defier.”

Zimbabwean Novelist, NoViolet Bulawayo considers Okparanta, “…a formidable force.” In her words,  “She [Okparanta] doesn’t tell easy stories, she tells necessary, even earth-shifting ones—the initial reception of Under the Udala Trees is a good case of the impact of her work. We know a writer is actually doing their job right when they make people lose their shit. They are also doing an even more important job when they make others possible. In choosing to tell humanizing stories that defied the literary trends and silence around African queer life, Chinelo became an important part of the reason why we are today in a position to celebrate the flourishing of writing that rightly holds African queerness to the sun.”

Bibliography
 Happiness, Like Water (collection of short stories), 2013
 Under the Udala Trees (novel), 2015
 Harry Sylvester Bird (novel), 2022

References

Further reading
 by Christopher Mari,  pp. 73–77

External links
 Official website
 Boen Wang, "Penn State alumna Okparanta reads short stories at Foster", Daily Collegian, November 7, 2014.
 
 "'Everyone Should Be An Artist, I Think.' An Interview With Chinelo Okparanta", Short Story Day Africa, March 23, 2016.
 Sarah Ládípọ̀ Manyika, "The Nigerian-American Writer Who Takes On Taboos", OZY.com, December 19, 2017.
 "Emmanuel Sigauke Interviews Chinelo Okparanta", Munyori Literary Journal, 2013
 Under the Udala trees, summary, Publishers Weekly, 2015
 Melissa Mordi, "Chinelo Okparanta - the Power of Women, Writing and Writing Women" (interview), The Guardian'' (Nigeria), 11 March 2019.

1981 births
21st-century American novelists
21st-century American short story writers
21st-century American women writers
21st-century Nigerian novelists
21st-century Nigerian women writers
American women academics
American women novelists
American women short story writers
Iowa Writers' Workshop alumni
Lambda Literary Award for Lesbian Fiction winners
Living people
Nigerian emigrants to the United States
Nigerian short story writers
Nigerian women novelists
Nigerian women short story writers
Pennsylvania State University alumni
Rutgers University alumni
Southern New Hampshire University faculty
Writers from Port Harcourt